Iolaus cottrelli, the Cottrell's sapphire, is a butterfly in the family Lycaenidae. It is found in Uganda, Kenya, Tanzania and Zambia.

References

Butterflies described in 1958
Iolaus (butterfly)